Shrijana Ghising (सृजना घिसिङ) (born 5 December 1999 in Makawanpur) is a Nepalese Para Taekwondo practitioner. She has been training with coach Kabiraj Negi Lama in Nepal Taekwondo Association since 2019.

Career 
She won the first historical gold medal for Nepal in the Riyadh 2022 World Para Taekwondo Grand Prix-Final (G-10) in Riyadh Saudi Arabia on 8th to 10th December 2022. She defeated the top three athletes in the world ranking respectively from Mexico player Jessica García Quijano, Brazilian player Cristhiane Nascimento, and Turkish player Meryem Betül Çavdar.

She also won a silver medal for Nepal in the 2021 Asian Youth Para Games. 

Ghising won a Silver medal for Nepal in the Para 4th WT President's Cup Asian Region Taekwondo Championships in March 14, 2022 Tehran, Iran .

References

1999 births
Living people
Nepalese female taekwondo practitioners
21st-century Nepalese women